Brad Neely's Harg Nallin' Sclopio Peepio is an American adult animated television series created by Brad Neely, who was also the creator of China, IL. Formatted as a sketch comedy show, it is made up of short films and routines, with songs composed by Neely. The series aired on Adult Swim from July 10 to September 18, 2016.

On November 15, 2016, the series was canceled after one season.

Contents
An animated sketch-comedy show, Harg Nallin comprises short, singular routines, short films, and songs. Each episode is a quarter-hour long, with some sketches lasting only a few seconds. As part of the main cast, Affion Crockett, Ilana Glazer, Darrell Hammond, Gabourey Sidibe, and Neely provide the voices of various characters. One guest star appears each episode.

Production
Brad Neely's Harg Nallin' Sclopio Peepio was announced a week before Adult Swim's upfront in the second week of May 2015. The show is the creation of Brad Neely, who conceived another Adult Swim program, China, IL. Daniel Weidenfeld, executive producer of the aforementioned series, holds the same position on Sclopio Peepio, as does Neely and Dave Newberg. Production of the first season commenced during production of Chinas third season and ended in January 2016. Before China was canceled in July 2015, the crew was given the impression Sclopio Peepio could intersect with the universe of China while the two aired simultaneously. Neely wanted to produce a fast-paced sketch comedy series because he feels both those qualities apply nicely to animation.

Borrowing the method used for writing China, IL, the show's writers work in a room where they propose roughly 50 ideas for sketches in a sitting. Some of these ideas derive from a list developed by Neely in the course of his life. By the end of the first season's production, 600 sketches were written, but only half were incorporated in the ten episodes of that season. According to Neely, the sketches discussing celebrities like Kanye West or Taylor Swift express his "strange associations" with those subjects rather than that of general public, leading to those sketches making the least sense. A large portion of the sketches are musical, with all songs composed by Neely. In June 2015, Neely was composing 75 pieces; a year later he had completed 100, but only 60 to 70 will appear in the first season.

The production company Titmouse, Inc., provides animation. With Sclopio Peepio, Weidenfeld expressed wanting a return to the arrangement and style of The Professor Brothers and Baby Cakes, two web series by Neely. Both led to the creation of China, which includes the title characters from those web series. The crew had even proposed sketches including characters from China, IL, but these were later cut.

Title

The show's unusual title, according to Neely, is "intentionally meaningless," being made up of the staff's "favorite collection of syllables." It was originally going to be titled TV Sucks, but was renamed during production. Before the premier of the first episode, Adult Swim opened with a bumper giving the following fictional dictionary entries for the words in the series title, with the definitions containing many additional nonsense words.

Release and reception
The first episode was released on Vine on June 27, 2016, ahead of its July 10 air date. This marks the first television program to have an episode released on the video-hosting service.

Devin D. O'Leary of the Weekly Alibi found the show unfunny as a whole, perhaps interesting only to enthusiasts of the network's increasingly strange programming. Daniel Kurland of the American Den of Geek, on the other hand, gave it four-and-a-half out of five stars. He called the music catchy and entertaining in their lyrical density and praised the visuals' Dadaism. The short length of some of his favorite sketches was cited as a disappointment.

Episodes

Notes

References

External links
 
 

2010s American adult animated television series
2010s American sketch comedy television series
2016 American television series debuts
2016 American television series endings
American adult animated comedy television series
American flash adult animated television series
English-language television shows
Adult Swim original programming
Television series by Williams Street
Television series created by Brad Neely